Ramon Harris (born May 26, 1988) is an American professional basketball player who last played for the Rethymno Cretan Kings of the Greek Basket League. Standing at 2.01 m (6'7"), he plays at the small forward position. After four years at Kentucky Harris entered the 2010 NBA draft but was not selected in the draft's two rounds.

High school career
Harris played high school basketball at West Anchorage High School in Anchorage, Alaska.

College career
Harris played four years with Kentucky Wildcats from 2006 to 2010, mostly coming off the bench.

Professional career
After going undrafted in the 2010 NBA draft, Harris began his pro career with the NBA Development League's Rio Grande Valley Vipers. After the pre-season, he was not signed, however. On February 8, 2011, he signed a deal with Trotamundos in Venezuela's top-level LPB league. He then joined Ningxia Hanas until the end of the season. On his debut, in a 106–95 win over Hangzhou, Harris started and played 33 minutes, scoring 16 points. He also pulled down 7 rebounds and picked up 3 steals.

On December 6, 2011, Harris was reacquired by the Fort Wayne Mad Ants in the NBA Development League where he stayed for one season before joining BG Göttingen. The next three seasons, he returned to the NBA Development League playing again with Fort Wayne Mad Ants, having also a small spell at Mexico, where he played with Rayos de Hermosillo.

On 2016, Harris moved to Iowa Energy. His really good performances caused the interest of the Memphis Grizzlies, but he never joined the team. The next season, he played again in the NBA Development League this time for Grand Rapids Drive.

On August 15, 2017, he joined Kolossos Rodou of the Greek Basket League. He joined Rethymno Cretan Kings in 2019. Harris averaged 5.1 points, 5.1 rebounds and 1.5 assists per game in 2019–20.

References

External links
ESPN.com Profile
Eurobasket.com Profile

1988 births
Living people
American expatriate basketball people in China
American expatriate basketball people in Germany
American expatriate basketball people in Greece
American expatriate basketball people in Mexico
American expatriate basketball people in Venezuela
American men's basketball players
Aris B.C. players
Basketball players from Alaska
BG Göttingen players
Fort Wayne Mad Ants players
Grand Rapids Drive players
Iowa Energy players
Kentucky Wildcats men's basketball players
Kolossos Rodou B.C. players
Rayos de Hermosillo players
Small forwards
Sportspeople from Anchorage, Alaska
Trotamundos B.B.C. players